Slevik is a village in the southern part of Fredrikstad municipality, Norway. Its population (SSB 2005) is 990.

Villages in Østfold